Mohammed Baki Jiji Alifoe (born 5 May 2003) is a Ghanaian professional footballer who plays as a midfielder for Ghanaian Premier League side Dreams F.C.

Career 
Baki started his career with Still Believe FC, the youth development team of Dreams FC. He was promoted to the senior team in February 2021. He made his debut on 25 February 2021, coming on as a 76th-minute substitute for Farhudu Suleiman in a 4–1 victory over Ashanti Gold. In March 2021, he signed his first professional contract with Dreams FC, ahead of the second round of the 2020–21 Ghana Premier League season. He was fully promoted to the first team and subsequently named on the team's squad list for the second round of the season.

References

External links 

Living people
Association football midfielders
Ghanaian footballers
Dreams F.C. (Ghana) players
Ghana Premier League players
2003 births